Ashraf Nu'man Al-Fawaghra (born 29 July 1986) is a Palestinian footballer who plays for Shabab Al-Khalil of the West Bank Premier League and the Palestine national team as a forward or attacking midfielder.

International career
Nu'man received his first national call-up for Palestine during 2010 AFC Challenge Cup qualification and made his debut six months later against the United Arab Emirates. He has since played for Palestine at the 2010 WAFF Championship, 2012 AFC Challenge Cup qualification, and 2014 FIFA World Cup qualification.

He was included in Jamal Mahmoud's 23-man list to participate in the 2014 AFC Challenge Cup. He netted his first goal of the competition in the second game against Myanmar in a 2–0 victory. He then scored a brace in the quarter final tie against Afghanistan helping his country qualify for their first final ever. During the final against the Philippines, he scored the only goal of the match, coming from a direct free-kick in the 59th minute of the game, winning the 2014 AFC Challenge Cup for his country for the first time ever, and qualifying for the 2015 AFC Asian Cup. He finished the tournament as top scorer with 4 goals totally in five games. He is tied with Fahed Attal for most goals ever with the Palestinian national team.

International goals
Scores and results list Palestine's goal tally first.

References

External links

 

1986 births
Living people
Palestinian footballers
Palestine international footballers
Al-Faisaly SC players
Al-Wehdat SC players
Al-Faisaly FC players
Hajer FC players
Taraji Wadi Al-Nes players
Saudi Professional League players
West Bank Premier League players
People from Bethlehem
2015 AFC Asian Cup players
Palestinian expatriate footballers
Expatriate footballers in Jordan
Expatriate footballers in Saudi Arabia
Palestinian expatriate sportspeople in Jordan
Palestinian expatriate sportspeople in Saudi Arabia
Association football midfielders